Javier Antonio "Toñito" Colón (born June 4, 1969) is a retired Puerto Rican basketball player. Colón spent his entire career as a point guard for the Leones de Ponce of the BSN from 1987 to 2008. Colón led the team to five championships during his career, and is currently third on assists of all-time in the league. Colón also played for the Puerto Rico National Basketball Team from 1990 to 1999.

Career

Colón was born in Ponce, Puerto Rico on June 4, 1969. He debuted with the Leones de Ponce in 1987 when he was 17 years old.

Colón became a starter for the team in 1989 and became its captain until 2004. In 1990, he led the Leones to its first championship in 24 years. The team would win again in 1992 and 1993, as Colón led a sharpshooting team known for its accuracy. Colón, along with teammates Bobby Ríos, José "Papote" Agosto, and Charlie Lanauze were referred to as the "Four Horsemen of the Apocalypse" by the media. Colón averaged 18.2 points per game in 1993, the highest of his career.

Colón and the Leones would reach the Finals again in 1995, 1996, 1998, and 2003. In 2004, they beat the Vaqueros de Bayamón for their fifth championship in 15 years. Colón dedicated the championship to the Mayor of Ponce Rafael Cordero Santiago, an avid fan of the team, who had died early that year.

Colón was selected as one of the league's best players of the 1990s, along with Eddie Casiano, James Carter, Edgar de León and José "Piculín" Ortiz.

In his last years as a player, Colón settled on a role of back-up point guard. He retired in 2008.

Statistics

|-
| align="left" | 1987
| align="left" | Ponce
| 19 || .517 || .500 || .808 || 0.8 || 1.0 || 4.6
|-
| align="left" | 1988
| align="left" | Ponce
| 30 || .522 || .320 || .767 || 1.0 || 1.7 || 6.1
|-
| align="left" | 1989
| align="left" | Ponce
| 30 || .584 || .426 || .773 || 2.8 || 5.9 || 12.6
|-
|style="text-align:left;background:#afe6ba;"| 1990
| align="left" | Ponce
| 24 || .485 || .314 || .688 || 3.3 || 9.0 || 11.9
|-
| align="left" | 1991
| align="left" | Ponce
| 30 || .517 || .528 || .743 || 4.3 || 6.3 || 14.0
|-
|style="text-align:left;background:#afe6ba;"| 1992
| align="left" | Ponce
| 21 || .458 || .407 || .906 || 4.4 || 7.1 || 15.7
|-
|style="text-align:left;background:#afe6ba;"| 1993
| align="left" | Ponce
| 34 || .525 || .489 || .896 || 4.5 || 5.3 || 18.2
|-
| align="left" | 1994
| align="left" | Ponce
| 26 || .481 || .371 || .809 || 4.0 || 6.2 || 14.8
|-
| align="left" | 1995
| align="left" | Ponce
| 16 || .462 || .333 || .772 || 3.7 || 7.2 || 16.8
|-
| align="left" | 1996
| align="left" | Ponce
| 33 || .488 || .343 || .808 || 4.8 || 6.8 || 15.3
|-
| align="left" | 1997
| align="left" | Ponce
| 28 || .488 || .410 || .904 || 5.2 || 6.8 || 16.9
|-
| align="left" | 1998
| align="left" | Ponce
| 30 || .552 || .434 || .836 || 5.0 || 7.1 || 15.8
|-
| align="left" | 2000
| align="left" | Ponce
| 18 || .472 || .364 || .829 || 3.0 || 4.2 || 10.8
|-
| align="left" | 2001
| align="left" | Ponce
| 25 || .421 || .406 || .864 || 4.0 || 5.5 || 13.6
|-
|style="text-align:left;background:#afe6ba;"| 2002
| align="left" | Ponce
| 28 || .466 || .429 || .792 || 4.1 || 5.1 || 15.3
|-
| align="left" | 2003
| align="left" | Ponce
| 29 || .440 || .368 || .838 || 4.5 || 4.4 || 14.3
|-
|style="text-align:left;background:#afe6ba;"| 2004
| align="left" | Ponce
| 29 || .462 || .483 || .736 || 3.6 || 4.8 || 11.2
|-
| align="left" | 2005
| align="left" | Ponce
| 32 || .399 || .414 || .727 || 3.6 || 3.4 || 10.2
|-
| align="left" | 2006
| align="left" | Ponce
| 25 || .356 || .362 || .721 || 2.5 || 2.9 || 9.0
|-
| align="left" | 2007
| align="left" | Ponce
| 28 || .395 || .328 || .744 || 1.2 || 1.4 || 5.2
|-
| align="left" | 2008
| align="left" | Ponce
| 20 || .298 || .333 || .750 || 0.5 || 0.8 || 2.6
|-
| align="left" | Career
| align="left" |
| 555 || .475 || .405 || .819 || 3.5 || 5.0 || 12.3

Olympic career
Colón was a member of Puerto Rico's National Basketball team for 9 years (1990–1999). As a member, he participated at the 1992 and 1996 Summer Olympics where the team finished 8th and 10th respectively. He also participated in several FIBA tournaments, winning a gold medal in 1995 and two silver medals in 1993 and 1997. Colón and the Puerto Rico team also won the gold at the 1991 Pan American Games and the 1994 Goodwill Games. Other tournaments and events were Colón participated with the Puerto Rico team were Centrobasket (winning two gold medals) and the Central American and Caribbean Games (winning one gold medal).

Colón quit the international team in 1999 after an injury had him sidelined the whole year.

References

External links
Toñito Colón Profile on BSNPR.com

1969 births
Living people
Baloncesto Superior Nacional players
Basketball players at the 1991 Pan American Games
Basketball players at the 1992 Summer Olympics
Basketball players at the 1995 Pan American Games
Central American and Caribbean Games gold medalists for Puerto Rico
Central American and Caribbean Games silver medalists for Puerto Rico
Competitors at the 1990 Central American and Caribbean Games
Competitors at the 1993 Central American and Caribbean Games
Leones de Ponce basketball players
Olympic basketball players of Puerto Rico
Pan American Games gold medalists for Puerto Rico
Pan American Games medalists in basketball
Point guards
Puerto Rican men's basketball players
Puerto Rico men's national basketball team players
1998 FIBA World Championship players
Goodwill Games medalists in basketball
Central American and Caribbean Games medalists in basketball
Competitors at the 1994 Goodwill Games
Medalists at the 1991 Pan American Games
1994 FIBA World Championship players